Croghan Mountain or Croghan Kinsella at , is the 211th–highest peak in Ireland on the Arderin scale, and the 258th–highest peak on the Vandeleur-Lynam scale. Croghan is situated at the far southeastern end of the Wicklow Mountains on the Wicklow and Wexford border, in Ireland.

Naming

The fuller name comes from the Uí Chinnsealaigh, who were the dominant gaelic family in the area; and is used to differentiate it from other "Cruachan" mountains.

Geography

Croghan is situated at the far southeastern end of the Wicklow Mountains on the Wicklow and Wexford border, in Ireland.  Croghan is separated from the main range on its own small massif that includes neighbouring Croghan East Top  (which gives Croghan the profile of a "double peak"), and Slievefoore  to the east. Croghan is the source of the River Bann with rises from its southern slopes.

Raheenleagh Wind Farm
The eastern side of Croghan contains the Raheenleagh Wind Farm, which was a 32.2 MW Coillte-ESB Group joint venture project that opened on 20 September 2016.  The wind farm was constructed in an existing Coillte forest, and consists of 11 Siemens Wind Power (108 – DD – 3.2MW) wind turbines.  The project received planning permission in 2012, and a 17-month construction process started in mid-2015.

In 2018, it was reported that Coillte had sold their 50 percent stake to Greencoat Renewables.

Bibliography

See also
Wicklow Way
Wicklow Mountains
Lists of mountains in Ireland
List of mountains of the British Isles by height
List of Marilyns in the British Isles
List of Hewitt mountains in England, Wales and Ireland

References

External links

MountainViews: The Irish Mountain Website, Croghan (or Croghan Kinsella)
MountainViews: Irish Online Mountain Database
The Database of British and Irish Hills , the largest database of British Isles mountains ("DoBIH")
Hill Bagging UK & Ireland, the searchable interface for the DoBIH

Mountains and hills of County Wicklow
Geography of County Wicklow
Hewitts of Ireland
Marilyns of Ireland